Festival Omladina (English: Youth Festival), also known as Omladinski Festival, is a music festival held in Subotica, Serbia. The festival was founded in 1961 as a competition of young composers of popular music. Their compositions were initially performed by pop singers, but soon the performers of competing compositions became rock bands. In the 1970s, the non-competitive part, featuring established rock acts, was added to the program, and in the 1980s the festival became a competition of young rock bands. During the years, some of the most notable acts of the Yugoslav pop and rock scene performed on the festival.

In 1990, at the beginning of the breakup of Yugoslavia, the festival ceased to exist. In 2011 the festival anniversary was celebrated with a concert of famous acts who made their first steps on the festival, and in 2012 the festival was reestablished.

1961
The festival was founded by the members of Mladost (Youth) Society for Culture and Arts, as a competition of young popular music composers. More than 120 compositions by composers from all parts of Yugoslavia were sent to the competition, 9 of which were chosen to be performed at the festival. The festival was held on 4 and 5 December in Subotica National Theatre. The songs were performed by young singers who were members of Mladost society. The youngest of them was six-year-old Evika Stražarković. The singers were accompanied by Mladost Brass and String Pop Orchestra conducted by Josip Kovač. The festival was recorded by Radio Belgrade.

Performers
Marika Matijević
Franjo Niderholcer
Katarina Dorožmai
Dijana Jančikin
Eva Stražarković
Marija Vuković
Ernest Zvekan
Viktor Sabo
Ilija Vorgučin
Vladimir Štulić
Gabor Gencel

Awards
First Prize – "Daj mi osmeh" by Kornelije Kovač
Second Prize – "Zvezde sreće" by Sylvester Levay
Third Prize – "Leto je prošlo" by Živko Janjić and Vlado Ljubičić
Audience's Choice Award – "Macko" by Lajoš Kurai
Best Lyrics Award – "Traganje u kiši" by Vojin Dolinka
Youngest Performer Award – Eva Stražarković (six years old)

1962
Around 120 songs were submitted for competition with 10 of them chosen to be performed at the festival. They were performed by budding singers. The festival was held on 17 and 18 November in Subotica National Theatre. The jury featured Radio Television Belgrade journalists Žika Dimitrijević, Stevan Markićević, and Aleksandar Korać, Mladost magazine journalist Gordana Jakovljević and Subotica city representatives Pavle Bačić and Josip Kovač. Each song was performed in two versions, by two different singers.

Competition

Awards
First Prize – "Susret" by Kornelije Kovač
Second Prize – "Vizija" by Gojko Novaković
Third Prize – "Sumrak" by Sylvester Levay
Audience's Choice Award – "Sumrak" by Sylvester Levay
Best Lyrics Award – "Susret" by Bogdan Stojadinović
Youngest Composer Award – Sylvester Levay
Most Rhythmic Composition Award – "Poljubac kraj reke" by Anton Zupanc

1963
The festival was held during 13, 14 and 15 September in Subotica National Theatre. 224 compositions were sent to the contest, 16 of which were performed on the festival. The performers were accompanied by Mladost orchestra. Once again, every song was performed in two different versions.

Competition

Awards
First Prize – "Zapisano u vetrovima" by Vera Radman and Veljko Vujčić
Second Prize – "Dođi" by Margareta Gobor
Third Prize – "Oči boje lešnika" by Kornelije Kovač
Audience's Choice Award – "Vrbe" by Zdenko Runjić
Best Lyrics Award – "Radoznali sunčev zrak" by Lajoš Kurai
Youngest Composer Award – Svetozar Radić
Most Cheerful Melody Award – "Nova ljubav" by Vladislav Kanić

1964
The fourth edition of the festival was held from 14 to 16 May, in National Theatre. It was the first edition of the festival to be held in May, which would become a tradition in the following years. Eighteen songs were performed at the festival, once again in two different versions. The performers included some of the future stars of the Yugoslav pop scene, like Bisera Veletanlić, Zafir Hadžimanov and Zoran Rambosek.

Competition

Awards
First Prize – "Sećanje na susret" by Vera Radman
Second Prize – "Mister Morse" by Brana Honjec
Third Prize – "Školsko zvono, mi i tvist" by Laslo Balaž
Audience's Choice Award – "Sećanje na susret" by Vera Radman
Youngest Composer Award – Laslo Balaž
Best Interpretation Award – Biserka Spevec
Best Composition about Life of the Youth Award – "Znam" by Jovan Adamov

1965
The fifth edition of the festival was held in Subotica National Theatre. Besides the Mladost society and Mladost magazine, the Society of Jazz and Pop Musicians and Ritam magazine also took part in the organization. The jury featured composers Bojan Adamič, Vojislav Simić and Aleksandar Korać and poet Miroslav Antić.

Competition

Awards
First Prize – "Naš dan" by Zvonko Čulina
Second Prize – "Nedovršene misli" by Jovan Adamov
Third Prize – "Oči neba" by Marko Tipurić
Audience's Choice Award – "Šetajući s tobom" by Vladimir Kanić
Best Lyrics Award – "Šetajući s tobom" by Vladimir Kanić
Most Cheerlful Composition Award – "Šetajući s tobom" by Vladimir Kanić
Youngest Composer Award – Tibor Balaš
Best Interpretation Award – Biserka Spevec
Youngest Performer Award – Tamara Šarić

1966
The sixth edition festival, held in Subotica National Theatre, featured 18 compositions performed by 21 artists. Once again, each song was performed in two versions, by two different singers.

The festival featured the very first public appearance by 17-year-old Kemal Monteno who would later go on to become one of Yugoslavia's most notable singer-songwriters.

Competition

Awards
First Prize – "Želim da znam" by Petar Bahun
Second Prize – "Odrasla si" by Jerko Rošin
Third Prize – "Ti i tvoje oči" by Slave Dimitrov
Audience's Choice Award – "Odrasla si" by Jerko Rošin
Best Lyrics Award – "Odrasla si" by Vanja Kraljević
Most Cheerful Composition Award – "Serenada" by Laslo Špang
Youngest Composer Award – Svetlana Ivanović (fifteen years old)
Best Interpretation Award – Mirjana Beširević and Milan Mutavdžić
Youngest Performer Award – Kemal Monteno and Radoslav Rukavina

1967
The seventh edition of the festival, held in Subotica National Theater, was the first one to be broadcast by television. Twenty songs were performed at the festival, each by two different singers.

Competition

Awards
First Prize – "Neću takvu ljubav" by Mihajlo Kovač
Second Prize – "Ljubav na plaži" by Vojkan Borisavljević
Third Prize – "Stani na čas" by Tibor Balaš
Audience's Choice Award – "Bio sam daleko" by Lajoš Pongo
Best Lyrics Award – "Svi moji prijatelji" by Jerko Rošin
Most Cheerful Composition Award – "Stani na čas" by Tibor Balaš
Most Modern Composition Awrad – "Ljubav na plaži" by Vojkan Borisavljević
Youngest Composer Award – Ifeta Olujić (nineteen years old)
Best Interpretation Award – Blaga Petreska and Mihajlo Dimitrijević
Youngest Performer Award – Ljiljana Petrović (thirteen years old)

1968
On the eight edition of the festival, held in Subotica National Theatre, 20 songs were performed, each by two different performers. It was the last edition organized by Mladost Society for Culture and Arts.

This was the first edition of the festival to include rock bands as performers, with the bands Džentlmeni and Zlatni Akordi performing songs by competing composers. The band Zlatni Akordi featured then little known singer Josipa Lisac, which was her only appearance on the festival.

Competition

Awards
First Prize – "Drugu ljubiš" by Slave Dimitrov
Second Prize – "Sunce sja za nas" by Frano Parac
Third Prize – "Ponekad" by Lajoš Pongo
Audience's Choice Award – "Balada" by Dražen Zimonjić
Most Modern Composition Award – "Drugu ljubiš" by Slave Dimitrov
Youngest Composer Award – Slobodan Stupar (seventeen years old)
Best Interpretation Award – Žarko Dančuo and Tatjana Gros

1969
The ninth edition of the festival was the first one to be organized by Subotica Culture Center and Radio Belgrade. It was also the first edition of the festival which was not held in Subotica National Theatre, but in Subotica Sports Hall, from 2 to 4 May. The jury consisted of former contestants, Kornelije Kovač, Lajoš Kurai, Jovan Adamov and Vojkan Borisavljević, and poet Petar Pajić. Until this edition of the festival, only the composers came from all parts of the country, while the performers were predominately the members of Mladost society; the ninth edition gave the opportunity to perform to musicians from all parts of Yugoslavia, so the performers included established acts like Ibrica Jusić, Ivica Percl, Indexi, Delfini, Džentlmeni, Bele Vrane and others. From this edition of the festival the songs were performed in one version only.

Competition

Awards
First Prize – "Jesen na njenom dlanu" by Đorđe Uzelac
Second Prize – "Ljiljana" by Slave Dimitrov
Third Prize – "Pleši, pleši, momo mila" by Marko Demichelli
Audience's Choice First Prize – "Prolaze godine" by Ferenc Kovač
Audience's Choice Second Prize – "Svaki dan sam" by Ivica Percl
Audience's Choice Third Prize – "Nikad neću biti sam" by Darko Billege
Best Lyrics Award – "Ona koju želim" by Božo Knežević
Best Interpretation Award – Dalibor Brun
Youngest Composer Award – Elizabeta Berčev (seventeen years old)

1970
As a part of the tenth anniversary celebration, the festival included a non-competitive part featuring performances by well known and less known rock acts. It was the first edition of the festival to feature a non-competitive program.

The Third Prize was awarded to Miodrag Cokić's composition "Kažu". On the final evening, during which the awarded compositions were performed once again, the performer of "Kažu", Dušan Prelević, went on the stage intoxicated. Because of this scandal he was banned from Radio Television Belgrade programs for a year.

Competition

Awards
First Prize – "U predvečerju" by Slobodan Samardžić
Second Prize – "Ljubav ti više nije važna" by Neven Mijat
Third Prize – "Kažu" by Miodrag Cokić
Audience's Choice First Prize – "Padao je sneg" by Gabor Lenđel
Audience's Choice Second Prize – "Jedne noći u decembru" by Kemal Monteno
Audience's Choice Third Prize – "Naši dani, Valerija" by Stjepo Martinović
Best Lyrics Award – "Kažu" by Dragan Nedimović
Best Debutant – Saša Petkovska
Youngest Composer Award – Suzana Saulić
Youngest Performer Award – Ladislav Mezel

Non-competitive program
Korni Grupa
Indexi
Mladi Levi
Entuzijasti

1971
In 1971, the festival was held in June. Twenty-two compositions were performed at the festival.

Awards
First Prize – "Nikad mi nije dosta da te gledam" by Husein Kazas; performed by Husein Kazas
Second Prize – "Ovce, ovce" by Nikola Borota; performed by Kamen Na Kamen
Third Prize – "Teuta, ljubavi moja" by Tomor Beriša; performed by Ljuba Ninković
Audience's Choice First Prize – "Ti si" by Stevan Burka; performed by Daniela Pančetović
Audience's Choice Second Prize – "Otišla je" by Branko Grga; performed by Mija Muratović
Audience's Choice Third Prize – "Jutri bo vse dobro" by Tomaž Domicelj; performed by Tomaž Domicelj
Best Lyrics Award – Snežana Lipovska
Best Interpretation Award – Oto Presner

1972
In 1972, the festival started on Youth Day (25 May), with a midnight concert. This was the first edition of the festival to feature, besides musical program, art exhibitions and poetry evenings.

The band Lutajuća Srca, who won the First Prize, Audience's Choice First Prize and the Best Lyrics Award, were unable to perform on the final evening, so, on their recommendation, at the time little known singer-songwriter Nenad Milosavljević performed instead of them. The song "Mom bratu" was performed by sixteen year old Vesna Čipčić, who would several years later start a successful acting career.

Competition

Awards
First Prize – "Još malo" by Miroljub Jovanović and Milan Marković
Second Prize – "Pastirica" by Jovica Škaro
Third Prize – "Samo ljubi" by Ištvan Boroš
Audience's Choice First Prize – "Još malo" by Miroljub Jovanović and Milan Marković
Audience's Choice Second Prize – "Raspevana gitara" by Stevo Prodanović
Audience's Choice Third Prize – "Pastirica" by Jovica Škoro
Best Lyrics Award – "Mrtev in bel" by Tomaž Domicelj and "Još malo" by Miroljub Jovanović and Milan Marković
Best Interpretation Award – Vele Matevski
Youngest Composer Award – Svetozar Nećak (seventeen years old)
Youngest Performer Award – Ladislav Mezel

1973
522 compositions were sent to the contest, more than to any of the previous editions. The performers were accompanied by Radio Television Belgrade Big Band, conducted by Bojan Adamič.

Competition

Awards
 First Prize – "Tražim" by Srđan Marjanović
 Second Prize – "Pred kraj neba" by Nenad Pavlović
 Third Prize – "Kara Gozlum" by Husein Kazas
 Audience's Choice First Prize – "Ti ne znaš dom gdje živi on" by Vlado Miloš
 Audience's Choice Second Prize – "Nek se ljudi čude" by Ljubiša Lolić
 Audience's Choice Third Prize – "Sanjala sma" by Zoran Markulj
 Best Lyrics Award – "Pred kraj neba" by Dušan Govedarica
 Best Interpretation Award – Srđan Marjanović
 Youngest Composer Award – Božidar Vučur
 Youngest Performer Award – Gazmend Palaska

1974
On the fourteenth edition of the festival the Union of Composers of Yugoslavia Award was introduced.

Awards
First Prize – "Ostanite tu" by Faruk Hasanbegović; performed by Ivica Tomović
Second Prize – "Legenda" by Predrag Jovičić; performed by San
Third Prize – "I gde je ljubav" by Slavica Stojković; performed by Sunce
Audience's Choice First Prize – "Ostanite tu" by Faruk Hasanbegović; performed by Ivica Tomović
Audience's Choice Second Prize – "Ona" by Milan Ukić; performed by Borivoje Platiša
Audience's Choice Third Prize – "Nemam vremena" by Gabor Lenđel; performed by Iver
Union of Composers of Yugoslavia Award – "Duša in jaz" by Marko Brecelj; performed by Marko Brecelj
Best Interpretation Award – Borivoje Platiša

1975
The fifteenth edition of the festival was the first one organised by Subotica Youth Center and Radio Television Novi Sad. It was marked by an unusual move: all 22 competing compositions were proclaimed the winning compositions.

1976
650 compositions were sent to the contest, from all parts of Yugoslavia, but also from Yugoslavs living abroad, 24 of which were chosen to compete at the festival. The festival was held in Subotica Sports Hall, in front of more than 5,000 spectators.

Awards
First Prize – "Mojot son" by Jordan Velinov; performed by Marija Ćuruvija
Second Prize – "Daj na neba" by Miladin Šobić; performed by Miladin Šobić
Third Prize – "I rešeto ima buze" by Ivica Čotić; performed by Zajedno
Fourth Prize – "Gde ćeš biti, lepa Kejo" by Ljubiša Lolić; performed by Suncokret
Audience's Choice First Prize – "Ti si ta što ja znam" by Mane Kolovski; performed by Momir Nikolovski
Audience's Choice Second Prize – "Ona je tu" by Zoran Ristivojević; performed by Marjan Miše
Audience's Choice Third Prize – "I rešeto ima buze" by Ivica Čotić; performed by Zajedno

1977
The festival featured three parts: the competition, rock evening, featuring well known and less known rock acts, and the evening of patriotic songs, entitled "Mladi pevaju Titu" ("Youth Sings to Tito"). The organizers decided to include the evening of patriotic songs in every future edition of the festival.

Awards
First Prize – "Zašto ponekad iz sna me bude zvuci nečijeg pijanina" by Ivo Lesić; performed by Đorđe Apostolovski
Second Prize – "Ne kucaj, srce, tako nemirno" by Mustafa Ismailovski; performed by Vesna Kartuš
Third Prize – "Koliko puta" by Zoran Todorović; performed by Hava
Audience's Choice Award – "Ne kucaj, srce, tako nemirno" by Mustafa Ismailovski; performed by Vesna Kartuš

Non-competitive program
Leb i Sol
Teška Industrija
Sonori
Drago Mlinarec
Suncokret
Ibn Tup
Jadranka Stojaković
Miladin Šobić

1978

The eighteenth edition of the festival was held from 11 to 13 May, in Subotica National Theatre and Subotica Sports Hall.

The performance of Rani Mraz on the evening of patriotic tunes remains one of the most memorable events in the history of the festival. On this occasion, the band for the first time performed their song "Računajte na nas" ("Count on Us"), which praised the People's Liberation War from the perspective of the youth and which would soon become an unofficial anthem of the Yugoslav youth.

Awards
First Prize – "Kad prođe vreme" by Miomir Pavlović; performed by Miomir Pavlović and Icina Deca
Second Prize – "Igraj, Makedonko" by Sotir Spasevski; performed by BT Top
Third Prize – "Zbogom, Bijelo Dugme" by Jerko Šunjko; performed by Vitomir Petković
Audience's Choice First Prize – "Uz huk mora" by Mirsad Huljić; performed by Zoran Miladinović
Audience's Choice Second Prize – "Ne mogu srce da prevarim" by Bodin Starčević; performed by Mira Ostojić
Audience's Choice Third Prize – "Neko te drugi ljubi" by Ivica Čotić; performed by Ivica Čotić
Best Interpretation Award – Mira Ostojić

Non-competitive program
Džambo Džet
Korak
Galija
Atomsko Sklonište
Generacija 5
Rani Mraz
Laboratorija Zvuka
Igra Staklenih Perli
Meta Sekcija
Tako

1979
The nineteenth edition of the festival was held from 17 to 19 May. It was crucial in festival's transition from competition of young composers to competition of young rock acts. Prior to the nineteenth edition, unaffirmed rock bands were invited to perform at the festival, but only in the non-competitive part, with mostly pop, pop rock and soft rock acts competing for awards; in 1979, the organizers decided that from this edition all unaffirmed acts which were invited to perform would be competing for awards. The competition featured 37 compositions.

The bands Pekinška Patka and Prljavo Kazalište were the first punk rock acts to perform at the festival. These two bands did not apply for the competition, but, alongside progressive rock band Boomerang and jazz rock band Den Za Den, got special invitation from the festival director Vitomir Simurdić, who wanted the festival to move away from pop format. Boomerang won the First Prize, Pekinška Patka won the Audience's Choice Second Prize, and Prljavo Kazalište was disqualified from the contest after performing gay-related song "Neki dječaci". Then little known musicians Robert Funčić and Vesna Vrandečić, who performed Funčić's song "Veruj mi" and won Audience's Choice First Prize, would two years later form the band Xenia.

Awards
First Prize – "Živjeti iznad tebe barem dan" by Zlatko Klun; performed by Boomerang
Second Prize – "Dubina" by Aleksandar Dujin; performed by Meta Sekcija
Third Prize – "Stiže poslednji autobus" by Branko Kovačić; performed by Branko Kovačić
Audience's Choice First Prize – "Veruj mi" by Robert Funčić; performed by Robert Funčić, Vesna Vrandečić and Marijan Balina.
Audience's Choice Second Prize – "Bela šljiva" by Nebojša Čonkić; performed by Pekinška Patka
Audience's Choice Third Prize – "Stiže poslednji autobus" by Branko Kovačić; performed by Branko Kovačić
Best Interpretation Award – Obećanje Proleća (performing "1979" by Branko Bogunović)

1980

Due to the death of Josip Broz Tito on 4 May, the twentieth edition of the festival was, instead in May, held in October. Twenty-four compositions competed for the awards. All three prizes by the jury and all three by the audience were given to rock bands. The festival anniversary was celebrated with performances of numerous artists who received acknowledgment after appearing on the festival: Bisera Veletanlić, Dalibor Brun, Kemal Monteno, Tomaž Domicelj, Lutajuća Srca, Miladin Šobić, Jadranka Stojaković, Leb i Sol, Boomerang and others. On its anniversary, the festival received numerous accolades: the Seven Secretaries of SKOJ Award, the Liberation of Subotica Award, the Radio Belgrade Golden Microphone Award, the PGP-RTB Silver Plaque, the FIDOF Award and several others.

The twentieth edition of the festival is notable as one of the most important moments in the history of Yugoslav new wave scene, as it included performance of some of the most notable new wave acts from Belgrade and Zagreb: Šarlo Akrobata, Idoli, Električni Orgazam, Film and Haustor. As on the previous edition of the festival, young bands did not apply for the competition, but got special invitations from the festival director Vitomir Simurdić. Other bands which got the invitation were the jazz rock band Na Lepem Prijazni and ska band Kontraritam. Film would be Awarded the First Prize, Šarlo Akrobata the Second Prize and Idoli the Audience's Choice Third Prize. The organizers initially did not take Električni Orgazam into consideration, but were persuaded to include the band into the program by Riblja Čorba leader Bora Đorđević. Električni Orgazam caused a scandal with their performance, which included damaging microphones and cymbals and destroying colored light bulbs which were part of the scenery, and were disqualified from the competition.

Awards
First Prize – "Neprilagođen" by Jura Stublić; performed by Film
Second Prize – "Ona se budi" by Milan Mladenović; performed by Šarlo Akrobata
Third Prize – "Masaž" by Vojko Aleksić; performed by Na Lepem Prijazni
Audience's Choice First Prize – "Szulettem" by Sabo Zoltan; performed by Eridanus
Audience's Choice Second Prize – "Gdje sam sad" by Branko Dabić; performed by Pauk
Audience's Choice Third Prize – "Zašto su danas devojke ljute" by Vlada Divljan and Srđan Šaper; performed by Idoli
Best Interpretation Award – Mateja Koležnik

Non-competitive part
Stevan Zarić
Bisera Veletanlić
Dalibor Brun
Ratko Kraljević
Kemal Monteno
Tomaž Domicelj
Lutajuća Srca
Ivica Tomović
Verica Ristevska
Miladin Šobić
Sabri Fejhulahu
Jadranka Stojaković
Leb i Sol
Boomerang

1981
On the twenty-first edition of the festival the Journalists' Award for Best Lyrics was introduced.

The competitors included young new wave bands Petar i Zli Vuci, Stidljiva Ljubičica, Modeli, Lačni Franz, Buldogi, Piloti, Termiti, Čista Proza and La Strada, all of them later becoming notable acts of the Yugoslav rock scene.

Awards
First Prize – "Ogledalo" by Petar i Zli Vuci; performed by Petar i Zli Vuci
Second Prize – "Moj prijatelj ide u vojsku" by Zlatko Đurašin; performed by Stidljiva Ljubičica
Third Prize – "Jutarnji modeli" by Vjeko Zajec; performed by Modeli
Audience's Choice First Prize – "Uzalud te čekam" by Milorad Nonin; performed by Dragica Stankov and Radio Television Novi Sad Big Band
Audience's Choice Second Prize – "Moj prijatelj ide u vojsku" by Zlatko Đurašin; performed by Stidljiva Ljubičica
Audience's Choice Third Prize – "Biće bolje" by Dimitrije Maksić; performed by Osma Sila
Best Interpretation Award – Lačni Franz (performing "Šank rock")
Journalists' Award for Best Lyrics – Radivoj Šajtinac

1982

Awards
First Prize – "Kar si skuhal, pojej" by Andrej Turku; performed by Martin Krpan
Second Prize – "Sladoled za vrane" by Đorđe Vasić; performed by Makakus
Third Prize – "Volim svoju povratnu kartu Sisak-Zagreb" by Mladen Šestić; performed by Zmijski Ugriz Mladog Lava
Audience's Choice First Prize – "Sladoled za vrane" by Đorđe Vasić; performed by Makakus
Audience's Choice Second Prize – "Čupave glave" by Metro; performed by Metro
Audience's Choice Third Prize – "Za dan, za san" by Vlasta Topličić; performed by Život
Best Interpretation Award – Meri Trošeljeva of Tadaima (performing "Pitaš li me kuda odlaze ptice")
Journalists' Award for Best Lyrics – Tadaima (performing "Pitaš li me kuda odlaze ptice")

1983
On the twenty-third edition of the festival, held from 19 to 26 May 36 compositions were competing for awards. On this edition, rock compositions and pop compositions were finally separated. Two separate competitions were held: Rock Evening and Schlager Evening.

The hard rock band Kerber, which won the Rock Evening First Prize, would two months after the festival release their debut album and become one of the most popular bands on the Yugoslav hard rock scene. The best Interpretation Award was won by little known young singer Mladen Vojičić of the band Top, who would a year later gain nationwide popularity as the singer of Bijelo Dugme.

Awards
Rock Evening First Prize – "Mezimac" by Zoran Stamenković; performed by Kerber
Rock Evening Second Prize – "Nekje k votu" by Đorđe Vasić; performed by Ultimat
Rock Evening Third Prize – "Karasko" by Ljupče Karo; performed by Tokmu Taka
Schlager Evening First Prize – "1. maj" by Miljenko Šercer; performed by Miljenko Šercer
Schlager Evening Second Prize – "Sve je muzika" by Ivana Vitaljić; performed by Ivana Vitaljić
Schlager Evening Third Prize – "Doviđenja, doviđenja" by Ljupčo Stojanovski; performed by Ljupčo Stojanovski
Audience's Choice Award – "Cesta" by Dragan Pavković; performed by Parudaštri
Best Interpretation Award – Mladen Vojičić of Top (performing "Lagala si")

1984
The twenty-fourth edition of the festival was held from 17 to 20 May. A smaller number of awards was given than during the previous editions, partially due to funding problems. On the Rock Evening, for the first time the award was given to the band for their complete performance, not for one composition.

The First Prize on the rock evening was won by the band Automobili. The prize included the recording of a studio album. As they were already working in studio on their debut album, they decided to give up on the prize in favor of the runner-up, the band Beta Centaury. With the release of their debut album later that year Automobili would rise to popularity. The band Zabranjeno Pušenje was invited to perform in the non-competitive part, but refused due to the fact that their applications from the time when they were an unaffirmed band were regularly refused.

Awards
Rock Evening First Prize – Automobili
Schlager Evening First Prize – "Balada za..." by Matej Zakonjšek; performed by Matej Zakonjšek
Audience's Choice Award – "Nemoj da mi kažeš" by Ljilja Mladenović and M. Stanisavljević; performed by Ljilja Mladenović and Tina Mladenović
Best Interpretation Award – Gordana Kostić and Goran Despotović (performing "Milo moje")
Journalists' Award for Best Lyrics – "Balada za..." by Matej Zakonjšek; performed by Matej Zakonjšek

1985

Awards
First Prize – Rock 'n' Feller (Ljubljana)
Audience's Choice Award – Rock Street (Belgrade)

1986
In 1986, the concept of competition of composers was officially abandoned, the festival was renamed to Festival pop i rok muzike (Festival of Pop and Rock Music) and became a competition of young unaffirmed bands.

Awards
First Prize – Bas Dans (Banja Luka)
Audience's Choice Award – Bas Dans

1987
The 1987 edition of the festival was marked by the jury's decision that all the bands which entered the finals – KUD Idijoti, Indust Bag, Mizar, Tužne Uši and Grad – are the winners. With the exception of Tužne Uši, all of the bands would rise to prominence, KUD Idijoti becoming one of the most notable punk rock bands and Mizar one of the most notable dark wave bands on the Yugoslav scene. The alternative rock band Center Za Dehumanizacijo, which would later also rise to prominence, also competed, but did not manage to enter the finals.

The non-competitive part included notable rock acts – Električni Orgazam, Gast'r'bajtr's, Kerber, Bambinosi, Autopsia, Tutti Frutti Balkan Band – as well as acts which would rise to fame in the following years – Zijan, Dr. Steel, Let 3, Blues Trio, Vrisak Generacije, Grč, Cacadou Look.

Competitors
Indust Bag (Metlika)
Plastic Face (Lazarevac)
KUD Idijoti (Pula)
Heavy Company (Jesenice)
Grad (Rijeka)
Bojler (Idrija)
Center Za Dehumanizacijo (Trate)
Oslobodioci (Obrenovac)
Tužne Uši (Split)
Mizar (Skopje)

Winners
KUD Idijoti
Indust Bag
Mizar
Tužne Uši
Grad

Non-competitive program

Zijan
S.O.R.
Električni Orgazam
The End Band
Gast'r'bajtr's
Bać Franje Iđe U Feketić
Heroji Ulice
Anno Dominni
Aragon
A Train
Bolid
Dr. Steel
Let 3
Blues Trio
Jovančić Jazz Quartet
Trio Dejana Pečenka
Vrisak Generacije
Grč
Cacadou Look
Bambinosi
Gasmasks
Dr Živago Dark Stars
Autopsia
Tikmajer Formatio
Bas Dans
Human Telex
Kerber
Fit
Radio
Tutti Frutti Balkan Band

1988
Both the First Prize and the Audience's Choice Award were won by the band Zijan, which, a year later, also won both the First Prize and the Audience's Choice Award at the Zaječar Gitarijada Festival.

Competitors
Del Arno Band (Belgrade)
Ludi Gavran (Belgrade)
Keith (Banja Luka)
Idejni Nemiri (Rijeka)
Sing Sing Singers (Novi Sad)
Zijan (Gevgelija)
Laufer (Rijeka)
Saygon (Skopje)

Awards
First Prize – Zijan
Audience's Choice Award – Zijan

1989

Competitors
Arhangel (Skopje)
Telo – Nauka Sovršena (Struga)
Obojeni Program (Novi Sad)
Super Nova (Skopje)
Civili (Zaječar)
Greaseballs (Zagreb)
Ponoćni Kauboj (Novi Sad)
Torpeda (Sarajevo)
Nesalomivi (Belgrade)

Awards
First Prize – Torpeda
Audience's Choice Award – Torpeda

1990
As Yugoslav Wars started in 1991, this edition of the festival would be the last before the anniversary edition in 2011.

Competitors
Daleka Obala (Split)
Royal Albert Hall (Skopje)
Budweiser (Belgrade)
Strogo Zaupno (Ruše)
Majke (Vinkovci)
Strelnikoff (Štore)
Kleopatra (Skopje)
Deca Loših Muzičara (Belgrade)

Awards
First Prize – Deca Loših Muzičara
Audience's Choice Award – Deca Loših Muzičara
Journalists' Choice Award – Deca Loših Muzičara

2011
In 2011, in order to mark the festival's 40th anniversary, a concert was held in Subotica Sports Hall, featuring numerous artists who gained first acknowledgements after their appearance on the festival. The performers were accompanied by orchestra led by Gabor Bunford. The bands Lutajuća Srca, Suncokret and Rezonansa all made reunions just for this occasion, while the band Generacija 5 reunited in the original lineup.

Performers

Leo Martin
Kemal Monteno
Ibrica Jusić
Zafir Hadžimanov
Vlada i Bajka
Lado Leskovar
Rezonansa
Bolid
Srđan Marjanović
Bisera Veletanlić
Lutajuća Srca
Tomaž Domicelj
Suncokret
Borivoj Platiša
Slave Dimitrov
Ratko Kraljević and Vesna Čipčić
Dušan Svilar
Stevan Zarić
Kornelije Kovač and Saša Vasić
Maja Odžaklievska
Atomsko Sklonište
Generacija 5
Severni Vetar
Goran Šepa
Mi
Narcis Vučina
Sylvester Levay

See also
List of historic rock festivals

References

External links
 Official website

Rock festivals in Serbia
Yugoslav rock music
Serbian rock music
Music festivals established in 1961
Recurring events established in 1961
Recurring events disestablished in 1990
Music festivals in Yugoslavia